Ambankadavu River is one of the tributaries of the river Thuthapuzha which, in turn, is one of the main  tributaries of the Bharathappuzha River, the second-longest river in Kerala, South India.

Other tributaries of the river Thuthapuzha
Kunthipuzha
Kanjirappuzha
Thuppanaduppuzha

References

Rivers of Malappuram district
Bharathappuzha